Jericole Hellems (born October 6, 1999) is an American professional basketball player for the Stockton Kings of the NBA G League. He played college basketball for the NC State Wolfpack of the Atlantic Coast Conference (ACC).

High school career
Hellems played basketball for Chaminade College Preparatory School in Creve Coeur, Missouri. As a junior, he averaged 22 points, seven rebounds and three assists per game. In his senior season, Hellems averaged 23 points, eight rebounds and three assists per game, leading his team to a Class 5 runner-up finish, and received Metro Catholic Conference Player of the Year honors. He scored the third-most points in school history, behind Bradley Beal and Jayson Tatum. A consensus four-star recruit, he committed to playing college basketball for NC State over offers from South Carolina, Arkansas, Florida, Virginia Tech and Georgia Tech.

College career
As a freshman at NC State, Hellems averaged 5.3 points and 2.5 rebounds per game. On December 5, 2019, Hellems scored a career-high 23 points in a 69–54 win against Wisconsin. He averaged 9.5 points and 3.4 rebounds per game in his sophomore season. As a junior, Hellems assumed a leading role after top scorer Devon Daniels suffered a season-ending knee injury. He averaged 12.9 points, five rebounds and 1.8 assists per game, earning All-Atlantic Coast Conference (ACC) honorable mention.

Career statistics

College

|-
| style="text-align:left;"| 2018–19
| style="text-align:left;"| NC State
| 36 || 0 || 13.7 || .386 || .319 || .750 || 2.5 || .7 || .4 || .3 || 5.3
|-
| style="text-align:left;"| 2019–20
| style="text-align:left;"| NC State
| 31 || 17 || 25.5 || .404 || .330 || .779 || 3.4 || 1.0 || .6 || .3 || 9.5
|-
| style="text-align:left;"| 2020–21
| style="text-align:left;"| NC State
| 25 || 24 || 31.5 || .452 || .383 || .771 || 5.0 || 1.8 || 1.1 || .2 || 12.9
|-
| style="text-align:left;"| 2021–22
| style="text-align:left;"| NC State
| 32 || 32 || 34.4 || .389 || .388 || .843 || 4.6 || 1.3 || 1.1 || .5 || 13.7
|- class="sortbottom"
| style="text-align:center;" colspan="2"| Career
| 124 || 73 || 25.6 || .408 || .364 || .797 || 3.8 || 1.2 || .8 || .3 || 10.0

Professional career
Hellems participated on the 2022 NBA Summer League team for the Boston Celtics. 

On July 31, 2022, Hellems signed his first professional contract overseas with Greek club Promitheas Patras. On October 18, 2022, he parted ways with the team to pursue opportunities stateside. Hellems entered the NBA G-league draft and was selected 5th overall by Oklahoma City.

Stockton Kings (2022–present)
On December 3, 2022, Hellems signed a contract with the Stockton Kings of the NBA G League. He was waived on January 24, 2023. On January 28, 2023, Hellems was reacquired by the Stockton Kings.

References

External links
NC State Wolfpack bio

1999 births
Living people
American men's basketball players
American expatriate basketball people in Greece
Basketball players from St. Louis
Birmingham Squadron players
Chaminade College Preparatory School (Missouri) alumni
NC State Wolfpack men's basketball players
Promitheas Patras B.C. players
Small forwards
Stockton Kings players